Mathana is a village in the Thanesar tehsil of Kurukshetra district in the Indian state of Haryana.

References 

Villages in Kurukshetra district